Casetagram Limited, trading as Casetify, is a Hong Kong-based company that designs and produces user-customized phone cases and electronic accessories. Founded in 2011 by Wesley Ng and  Ronald Yeung, the company first featured custom phone cases by using Instagram photos. It later expanded to selling accessories with different designs. Since then, it has become the fastest growing tech accessory brand in the world, having sold more than 25 million phone cases.

The company is headquartered in Hong Kong and has offices in Los Angeles.

History 
Formerly Casetagram, Casetify's initial products were customized cell phone cases created using the purchaser's Instagram photos. Users could upload images from Instagram to an interface that allowed them create a custom collage or single-image case. Users can now create custom cases using photos from Instagram and Facebook, or by directly uploading photographs and adding custom text. Casetify now produces additional products such as tech accessories.

The company has Brick and mortar locations in the United States, Hong Kong, including a flagship store in the city's Landmark Mall complex, Japan, South Korea and a pop-up store in Bangkok, Thailand. As of October 2022, Casetify had a 4.0 user rating on Trustpilot.

Partnerships & Collaborations 
To create cases highlighting excellent art, Casetify has begun working with internationally renowned artists, galleries, and museums. The Louvre collection features art by Leonardo da Vinci, Eugène Delacroix and ancient works such as the Venus de Milo. The Metropolitan Museum of Art partnered with Casetify to licenses products featuring the art of Vincent van Gogh, Degas and Monet. Casetify has also partnered with individual artists such as David Shrigley and Yayoi Kusama to produce collections featuring their work.

Casetify has also collaborated with more than 100 companies, including brands such as DHL, Blanc & Eclare, Pokémon, Pixar, Lucas Film, Vetements, and K-pop group BTS for phone case collections.

References

External links 

 

Hong Kong brands
Manufacturing companies of Hong Kong
Companies established in 2011
Fashion accessory brands